Gordon Alexander Brown  (28 November 1907 – 16 July 1982) was a New Zealand accountant, co-operative retail manager, businessman, rugby administrator and local politician. He was born in Turakina, New Zealand, on 28 November 1907.

In the 1975 New Year Honours, Brown was appointed an Officer of the Order of the British Empire, for services to the community.

References

1907 births
1982 deaths
Deputy mayors of places in New Zealand
Local politicians in New Zealand
Wellington Harbour Board members
20th-century New Zealand businesspeople
New Zealand Officers of the Order of the British Empire
20th-century New Zealand politicians
People from Turakina
Palmerston North City Councillors